{{DISPLAYTITLE:C6H8O}}
The molecular formula C6H8O (molar mass: 96.13 g/mol, exact mass: 96.05751 u) may refer to:

 Cyclohexenone
 2,5-Dimethylfuran
 2,3-Dimethylfuran
 2,4-Dimethylfuran
 3,4-Dimethylfuran